Carlos Cardoso may refer to:

 Carlos Cardoso (journalist) (1951–2000), Mozambican journalist murdered in 2000
 Carlos Cardoso (footballer) (born 1944), Portuguese football manager
 Carlos Alexandre Cardoso (born 1984), Brazilian football defender
 Carlos M. Cardoso, American businessman